Simon Allford (born July 1961) is a British architect, co-founder and director of Allford Hall Monaghan Morris (AHMM), chair of the board of trustees of The Architecture Foundation, and current president of the Royal Institute of British Architects. 

The son of an architect, Simon Allford was born in July 1961. He attended the University of Sheffield and the Bartlett School of Architecture, where he has since worked as a lecturer.

In 1989, with Jonathan Hall, Paul Monaghan and Peter Morris, he established AHMM. The practice today employs over 500 people working on projects in education, healthcare, housing, arts and offices. In 2017, it became majority employee-owned through an employee ownership trust.

In November 2013, it was announced that Allford would be the new chair of the board of trustees of The Architecture Foundation.

RIBA president 
In April 2020, Allford criticised the Royal Institute of British Architects in Architects' Journal, describing it as "sadly ever-less relevant", and was subsequently urged by RIBA members to seek election as president and bring about some change at the institute. In August 2020, Allford was elected to be the next RIBA president; serving a two-year term, he succeeded Alan Jones on 1 September 2021. He subsequently said that:"The RIBA has to focus on where it is useful. ... The members are the ... intellectual powerhouse of the profession, not the institute. ... There is an opportunity to reboot to become smaller, leaner and more agile. The RIBA's efforts were diluted by trying to do everything for everyone."

In March 2022, Allford was accused of a conflict of interest after his practice AHMM was shortlisted in a RIBA-organised competition to design a new base for the Maltings Cultural Venue in Berwick-upon-Tweed, Northumberland. A RIBA spokesman said the evaluation process had been managed by Northumberland County Council, and not by the RIBA. "The RIBA president was not involved in any way in the evaluation process, and will not be personally involved in The Maltings project. His direct connection to the RIBA, and the practice’s indirect connection to the RIBA through him, had no bearing on the selection panel’s decision making."

In early April 2022, a RIBA walking tour of London's Barbican Estate was ambushed by residents protesting against AHMM's involvement in a 24-storey tower at Houndsditch, claiming it will cause loss of light to flats and community amenity areas. A leaflet asserted: "Allford used his RIBA position to push forward plans that will blight the lives of Middlesex Street Estate residents in the east of the City."

References

1961 births
Living people
Architects from London
Alumni of the University of Sheffield
Alumni of University College London
Presidents of the Royal Institute of British Architects